1965 Speedway World Team Cup was the sixth edition of the FIM Speedway World Team Cup to determine the team world champions.

The final took place in Kempten, West Germany. The World Champion title was won by Poland..

Format

* Replacement teams not eligible to qualify
** Great Britain seeded to the final

Qualification

Continental Semi-Final 1

 August 1
  Olching

Continental Semi-Final 2

 August 1
  Meissen

Scandinavian Round
 May 14
  Odense

Continental Final

 August 22
  Ufa

World final

 September 5
  Kempten

See also
 1965 Individual Speedway World Championship

References

Speedway World Team Cup
1965 in speedway
September 1965 sports events in Europe